Emery Ellsworth "Swede" Larson (November 10, 1898 – November 7, 1945) was an American football coach and United States Marine Corps officer.  He was the 23rd head football coach at the United States Naval Academy in Annapolis, Maryland, serving for three seasons, from 1939 to 1941, and compiling a record of 16–8–3.  Larson died on November 7, 1945, in Atlanta, Georgia.

Head coaching record

References

External links
 

1898 births
1945 deaths
Navy Midshipmen football coaches
Navy Midshipmen football players
United States Marine Corps officers
People from Wright County, Minnesota
Burials at Arlington National Cemetery
Military personnel from Minnesota